Ebodina lagoana is a species of moth of the family Tortricidae. It is found in Nigeria.

References

Endemic fauna of Nigeria
Moths described in 2000
Polyorthini
Insects of West Africa
Moths of Africa